Lucas Possignolo (born 11 May 1994), or simply Lucas, is a Brazilian professional footballer who plays as a central defender for Chinese Super League club Zhejiang.

Club career
He made his professional debut in the Segunda Liga for Portimonense on 9 March 2014 in a game against Desportivo das Aves.

On 17 April 2022, he joined Chinese Super League club Zhejiang.

Career statistics
As of match played 31 January 2023.

References

External links
 

1994 births
Living people
People from Piracicaba
Brazilian footballers
Association football central defenders
São Paulo FC players
Portimonense S.C. players
Zhejiang Professional F.C. players
Brazilian expatriate footballers
Expatriate footballers in Portugal
Expatriate footballers in China
Brazilian expatriate sportspeople in Portugal
Brazilian expatriate sportspeople in China
Liga Portugal 2 players
Primeira Liga players
Chinese Super League players
Footballers from São Paulo (state)